{{Infobox college basketball team
| name = Iowa State Cyclones
| current = 2022–23 Iowa State Cyclones men's basketball team
| logo = Iowa State Cyclones logo.svg
| logo_size = 150
| university = Iowa State University
| firstseason = 1907
| record = 1431–1390
| conference = Big 12
| location = Ames, Iowa
| coach = T. J. Otzelberger
| arena = Hilton Coliseum
| capacity = 14,267
| studentsection = Cyclone Alley
| nickname = Cyclones
| h_body = 822433
| h_pattern_b = _thinsidesonwhite
| h_shorts = 822433
| h_pattern_s = _blanksides2
| a_pattern_b = _thingoldsides
| a_body = 822433
| a_shorts = 822433
| a_pattern_s = _thingoldsides
| 3_pattern_b = _thinmaroonsides
| 3_body = FCD116
| 3_shorts = FCD116
| 3_pattern_s = _isucardinalsides
| NCAAchampion = 
| NCAAfinalfour = 1944 
| NCAAeliteeight = 1944, 2000
| NCAAsweetsixteen = 1986, 1997, 2000, 2014, 2016, 2022
| NCAAroundof32 = 1986, 1992, 1995, 1996, 1997, 2000, 2005, 2012, 2013, 2014, 2016, 2017, 2022
| NCAAtourneys = 1944, 1985, 1986, 1988, 1989, 1992, 1993, 1995, 1996, 1997, 2000, 2001, 2005, 2012, 2013, 2014, 2015, 2016, 2017, 2019, 2022, 2023
| conference_tournament = 1996, 2000, 2014, 2015, 2017, 2019
| conference_season = 1935, 1941, 1944, 1945, 2000, 2001}}
The Iowa State Cyclones men's basketball team represents Iowa State University (ISU) and competes in the Big 12 Conference of NCAA Division I. The Cyclones play their home games at Hilton Coliseum on Iowa State's campus.

 History 

 Early years (1908–1980) 
From 1907 to 1928, the Cyclones played in the Missouri Valley Intercollegiate Athletic Association, managing a few winning records in-conference but no championships. In 1929, the Cyclones moved to the Big Six Conference and named Louis Menze as head coach. Over the next 19 years, Menze would lead the Cyclones to four conference championships (their only seasons with a winning conference record in this period). Two of these teams earned consideration for the then eight-team NCAA tournament; the 1941 squad lost in a pre-Tournament "qualifying game" to Creighton.  Three years later, the 1944 team beat Pepperdine to reach the semifinals in the tournament proper before losing its next game against eventual champion Utah, good for a spot in history as a Final Four participant.

After Menze's last conference win in 1945 and subsequent resignation as coach in 1947 (he would remain Iowa State's athletic director until 1958, having taken the position in 1945), the Cyclones floated between the bottom and the middle of the conference for decades, their main claim to fame being two wins of the conference's annual "Holiday tournament", played between Christmas and New Year's Day in Kansas City, in 1955 and 1959. Neither these tournament wins, nor their regular season performances, qualified the Cyclones for postseason play in the 33 years between Menze's and Johnny Orr's stints in the head coaching position. However, the 1957 Cyclones were ranked #3 in the nation after handing Wilt Chamberlain's #1 Kansas its first loss.

Gary Thompson outscored Chamberlain, while Don Medsker held Chamberlain to 17 points the 2nd lowest of his career and then hit the game winner at the buzzer. No. 3 remains the school's highest-ever national ranking. From the introduction of the Big Eight's postseason tournament in 1977 until Johnny Orr's fifth season in 1985, the Cyclones did not advance past their first game.

In 1971, Maury John left Drake University to move to Iowa State. John led Drake to the 1969 NCAA Final Four and the Elite Eight in 1970 NCAA tournament and 1971 NCAA tournament. John inherited an Iowa State team that was 5–21 the previous season. John was excited about the new Hilton Coliseum and led Iowa State to a 12–14 record in 1971–1972 and a 16–10 record in 1972–1973, a 15-year best. On Dec. 2, 1971, in the first game played at Hilton Coliseum, John led the Cyclones to a victory over Arizona 71–54. Said Cyclone announcer Eric Heft, a player for Coach John: "The place was sold out for the Arizona game and we doubled the capacity of season tickets from the season before. We didn't have all the fanfare you have today, but it was packed. It was my first game and Maury John's first game as the head Cyclone coach as well."

In the 1973–74 season, Iowa State was off to a 4–1 start. But, John sat out the remainder of the 1973–74 season after a cancer diagnosis. Assistant Gus Guydon (11–10) finished the season. In October 1973, John had seen a doctor after having health concerns. Two months later, on the day his Iowa State team lost at Drake, John was told he had an inoperable malignant tumor at the base of his esophagus. "It was a bolt out of the blue for someone who lived his life free of smoking or drinking," His son John said later. "There was high stress. But he was always healthy."

John was optimistic about returning to Iowa State in 1974–75, but his health worsened and he resigned on July 30, 1974. John said "It's going to be hard for me not to be on that bench. I won't have to sweat out all those games down on the floor. But truthfully, I'd rather be down there sweating them out." John died on October 15, 1974, at the age of 55. During a 28‐year coaching career, John had a 528–214 record. John's departure sent the Cyclones into free fall. In the next six years, Iowa State would only have one winning season, bottoming out in 1975–76 with a 3–24 record, still the worst in school history.

 Johnny Orr era (1980–1994) 

Johnny Orr came to Iowa State from Michigan in 1980. Iowa State's athletics director had called Orr to inquire about Michigan assistant Bill Frieder. When Orr learned of the salary Iowa State would offer Frieder, he negotiated the Iowa State head coaching job for himself. Orr is credited with building "Hilton Magic" and laying the foundation for Iowa State's success in men's basketball. A number of Cyclone greats played for Orr, including Jeff Grayer, Barry Stevens, walk-on Jeff Hornacek, Lafester Rhodes, Justus Thigpen, Victor Alexander, Fred Hoiberg, Julius Michalik, and Loren Meyer, many of whom would go on to success in the NBA.

Orr's first team (1980–81), led by junior forward Robert Estes (14.9 points per game, 6.7 rebounds per game) produced a lackluster 9–18 record. Freshman forward Ron Harris, whom Orr considered his first prominent Cyclone recruit, contributed per-game averages of 13.7 points and 5.9 rebounds.

Led by sophomore Ron Harris and freshman recruit Barry Stevens of Flint, Michigan, Orr's 1981–82 team finished the season with a 10–17 overall record and a 5–9 record in Big Eight play. Harris gave the Cyclones 13.3 points per game, while Stevens contributed 13.0 points per game. Senior Robert Estes added 10.3 points per game.

The Cyclones improved to a 13–15 overall record in the 1982–83 season, but again finished 5–9 in conference play. Many of the Cyclone faithful regard sophomore Barry Stevens' buzzer-beating shot against 10th-ranked Missouri during the 1982–83 season as the foundational example of "Hilton Magic." Stevens tallied per-game averages of 16.8 points and 5.2 rebounds for the season. Ron Harris contributed 14.3 points per game.

Orr's 1983–84 team recorded the first winning season of his tenure at Iowa State—and the first winning season for Cyclone basketball since Lynn Nance's 1977–78 team finished 14–13—with a 16–13 overall mark and a 6–8 record in conference play. The Cyclones played in the 1984 National Invitation Tournament (NIT), losing to Marquette in the first round. Junior forward Barry Stevens averaged 22.2 points per game on the season. Seniors Terrence Allen and Ron Harris each averaged 11.0 points per game.

Led by senior Barry Stevens and freshman forward Jeff Grayer, natives of Flint, Michigan known at Iowa State as "The Flintstones", the 1984–85 Cyclones finished tied for third in conference play (7–7) and finished 21–13 overall. Iowa State advanced to the NCAA tournament for the first time under Orr and for just the second time in the history of the program. The Cyclones, the #13 seed in the Midwest Region, lost to #4 seed Ohio State by a score of 75–64. ISU managed to upset 10th-ranked Kansas twice during the regular season. Stevens averaged 21.7 points per game. Junior guard Jeff Hornacek recorded 12.5 points per game, and Grayer averaged 12.2 points and 6.5 rebounds on the season.

Despite the departure of two-time first-team All-Big Eight forward Stevens, the 1985–86 campaign saw First-team All-Big Eight players Grayer and Hornacek lead the Cyclones to their most successful season yet under Orr. Iowa State finished with a 22–11 overall mark and a 9–5 record and second-place finish in conference play. The Cyclones advanced to the NCAA tournament in consecutive years for the first time in school history. With wins over #10 seed Miami (Ohio) and #2 seed Michigan, the #7 seed Cyclones reached the "Sweet Sixteen" before falling to #6 seed North Carolina State, 70–66. Grayer led the Cyclones with per-game averages of 20.7 points and 6.3 rebounds. Hornacek averaged 13.7 points per game. The Cyclones upset 5th-ranked Oklahoma and 4th-ranked Kansas during the regular season.

The 1986–87 Cyclones finished with a 13–15 overall record and a 5–9 record in Big Eight play, missing postseason tournament competition for the first time in four seasons. Grayer (now a junior) averaged 22 points and 7 rebounds per game, while senior Tom Schafer averaged 18 points and 6 rebounds. Despite their struggles, the 1986–87 Cyclones managed wins over two ranked teams (15th-ranked Kansas and 12th-ranked Oklahoma).

Orr's 1987–88 Cyclones rebounded from the losing season of the prior year to finish 20–12 overall and 6–8 in conference play, including wins over #2 Purdue, #7 Iowa, #16 Kansas, and #15 Missouri. Iowa State returned to the NCAA tournament, losing 90–78 to #5 seed Georgia Tech in the first round. The Cyclones were led by senior and three-time first-team All-Big Eight forward Jeff Grayer and senior Lafester Rhodes, who averaged 25 and 22 points per game, respectively.

The 1988–89 Cyclones finished the season 17–12 overall and 7–7 in conference play, including a victory over third-ranked Missouri in Hilton Coliseum. The Cyclones advanced to their fourth NCAA tournament under Orr, losing 84–74 to #7 seed UCLA in the first round. Sophomore Victor Alexander averaged 20 points and 9 rebounds per game on the season. Sophomore Mark Baugh averaged 13.3 points per game, while Sam Mack contributed per-game averages of 11.8 points and 8.1 rebounds.

Following the loss of key players to attrition and legal problems in the offseason, the 1989–90 Cyclones finished 10–18 overall and 4–10 in conference play, marking the Cyclones' second-worst season under Orr. Only Orr's 1980–81 team, his first at ISU, had finished with a worse overall record. Junior Victor Alexander averaged 19.7 points and 8.7 rebounds per game. Senior guard Terry Woods averaged 16 points per game.

The 1990–91 season saw the Cyclones finish with an overall record of 12–19 and a conference record of 6–8. Despite their poor overall performance, the Cyclones managed wins over two ranked teams (#12 Oklahoma State and #21 Oklahoma). Senior Victor Alexander averaged 23.4 points per game and 9.0 rebounds per game, while senior Doug Collins averaged 14.3 points per game.

Iowa State's fortunes improved during the 1991–92 season, with the Cyclones finishing 21–13 overall (5–9 in conference play) and earning the #10 seed in the East Region of the NCAA tournament. The Cyclones defeated #7 seed UNC Charlotte in the opening round before losing 106–98 to #2 seed Kentucky in the round of 32. Iowa State recorded wins over #16 Iowa, #21 Oklahoma, #2 Oklahoma State, #3 Kansas, and #13 Missouri during the regular season. Junior Justus Thigpen led the team with 16.3 points per game, while junior Ron Bayless averaged 12.6 points per game. Freshmen Julius Michalik and Fred Hoiberg averaged 13.6 and 12.1 points per game, respectively.

Iowa State finished the 1992–93 season with a 20–11 overall record and a second-place 8–6 record in conference play. The Cyclones advanced to their sixth and final NCAA tournament under head coach Johnny Orr, losing in the first round to #9 seed UCLA, 81–70. Iowa State managed victories over #12 Oklahoma and #7 Kansas during the regular season. Seniors Justus Thigpen and Ron Bayless led the team with 17.6 points and 13.3 points per game, respectively. Sophomore Julius Michalik and Ames native and sophomore Fred Hoiberg contributed 12.0 and 11.6 points per game, respectively.

In the 1993–94 campaign—Orr's final season as Iowa State men's basketball head coach—the Cyclones posted a 14–13 overall mark and a 4–10 record in conference play. ISU was led by a trio of juniors—Loren Meyer, Fred Hoiberg, and Julius Michalik, each of whom averaged over 20 points per game on the season.

Orr retired from coaching in 1994. He remains the winningest coach in Iowa State history (in terms of total wins), with a win–loss record of 218–200 as the head coach of the Cyclones.

 Tim Floyd era (1994–1998) 
Following Johnny Orr's retirement, Iowa State hired Tim Floyd from the University of New Orleans to become the next men's basketball head coach. Floyd's first ISU team recorded a 23–11 overall mark and a 6–8 mark in conference play, and advanced to the second round of the 1995 NCAA tournament by beating Florida, 64–61, before losing 73–51 to #2 seed North Carolina. Senior Fred Hoiberg averaged 19.9 points per game. Seniors Loren Meyer and Julius Michalik averaged 15.7 points and 9.0 rebounds per game and 14.3 points and 5.4 rebounds per game, respectively.

Following the graduation of four starters from the 1994–95 Cyclones, Tim Floyd replenished his roster with several junior college and Division I transfers. Four of the 1995–96 team's starters had not been part of the ISU roster during the prior season, with sophomore point guard Jacy Holloway being the lone exception. Dedric Willoughby transferred to Iowa State from the University of New Orleans, and Kenny Pratt, Shawn Bankhead, and Kelvin Cato each transferred from junior colleges to play for the Cyclones. The 1995–96 Cyclones finished with a 24–9 overall record, a second-place 9–5 conference record, and the final Big Eight tournament championship—the first conference tournament championship in Cyclone basketball history—with a 56–55 victory over Roy Williams' Kansas Jayhawks. Iowa State earned the #5 seed in the Midwest Region of the NCAA tournament, the then-highest seed achieved in ISU men's basketball history. The Cyclones defeated #12 seed California 74–64 in the first round of the Tournament; Rick Majerus' #4 seed Utah Utes defeated ISU 73–67 in the second round. Dedric Willoughby averaged 20.5 points per game on the season. Kenny Pratt averaged 15.3 points and 6.5 rebounds per game, while Kelvin Cato contributed per-game averages of 9.6 points and 7.7 rebounds.

The 1996–97 Cyclones returned all five starters from the previous season's Big Eight tournament championship and NCAA Tournament team. Iowa State finished with a 22–9 overall record and a 10–6 conference mark in the inaugural season of the Big 12 Conference. The Cyclones would advance to the third NCAA tournament Sweet Sixteen in Iowa State men's basketball history with victories over Illinois State and Cincinnati, before falling in a 74–73 overtime loss to UCLA. Senior Dedric Willoughby averaged 18.9 points per game for the season, and seniors Kenny Pratt and Kelvin Cato averaged 14.7 points and 6.1 rebounds per game and 11.3 points and 8.4 rebounds per game, respectively.

Tim Floyd's 1997–98 Cyclones finished the season with a 12–18 overall record and a 5–11 conference record. Freshman forward Marcus Fizer averaged 14.9 points and 6.7 rebounds per game, and Klay Edwards contributed per-game averages of 9.3 points and 7.7 rebounds. Following the season, Floyd left Iowa State to replace Phil Jackson as the head coach of the Chicago Bulls.

 Larry Eustachy era (1998–2003) 
Iowa State hired Larry Eustachy from Utah State to fill the head coaching position vacated by Tim Floyd. In his first season, Eustachy led the Cyclones to 15–15 overall record and a 6–10 record in Big 12 play. Sophomore Marcus Fizer averaged 18 points and 7.6 rebounds per game. Michael Nurse and Martin Rancik both averaged 10.3 points per game.

Following his first season, Eustachy gained the services of two guards, Jamaal Tinsley and Kantrail Horton, via transfer. The 1999–2000 Cyclones returned Marcus Fizer, Martin Rancik, Michael Nurse, and Stevie Johnson from the previous season's team. Iowa State finished the season 32–5 overall, setting a school record for wins in a season. The Cyclones finished 14–2 in conference play to earn the outright Big 12 Conference regular season championship—the sixth regular season conference title in the program's history, and the first since 1945. The Cyclones then defeated Oklahoma 70–58 in the Big 12 basketball tournament finals to win the Big 12 conference tournament championship, the second conference tournament title in ISU men's basketball history. The #2 seed Cyclones advanced to the Elite Eight of the 2000 NCAA tournament after wins over #15 seed Central Connecticut State, #7 seed Auburn, and #6 seed UCLA by 10, 19, and 24 points, respectively, but ultimately fell to Michigan State, the eventual NCAA Champion, in the regional finals by a score of 75–64 (the differential representing the Spartans' narrowest margin of victory during the tournament). It was the Cyclones' deepest NCAA Tournament run in the modern era. The Big 12 champion Cyclones were led in scoring by All-American forward and eventual fourth pick of the 2000 NBA draft Marcus Fizer, who averaged 22.8 points per game and 7.7 rebounds per game. Michael Nurse and first team All-Big 12 guard Jamaal Tinsley contributed 12.5 points and 11 points per game, respectively.

Despite the departure of Marcus Fizer to the NBA, Eustachy's 2000–01 Cyclones, led by returning senior and eventual All-American guard Jamaal Tinsley and senior Kantrail Horton, managed a 25–6 overall record and a 13–3 record in conference play, earning a second consecutive Big 12 regular season championship. Iowa State earned a #2 seed in the NCAA tournament, but the Cyclones' season ended with a stunning 58–57 defeat at the hands of #15 seed Hampton. Iowa State became just the fourth #2 seed to lose to a #15 seed since the expansion of the Tournament field to 64 teams in 1985. Jamaal Tinsley led the team in scoring with 14.3 points per game. Martin Rancik and freshman Jake Sullivan added 13.2 points per game and 11.4 points per game, respectively.

The 2001–02 Cyclones produced the worst overall men's basketball record since the 1990–91 season, finishing 12–19 overall record and 4–12 in conference play. Tyray Pearson averaged 18.7 points and 7.8 rebounds per game. Jake Sullivan and Shane Power contributed per-game averages of 16 points and 13.6 points, respectively.

The 2002–03 Cyclones finished with a 17–14 overall record and a 5–11 conference record. ISU accepted an invitation to the NIT. The Cyclones defeated Wichita State in the opening (play-in) round, but fell 54–53 to Iowa in the first round. Jake Sullivan led the team in scoring with 17 points per game. Jackson Vroman contributed 12.5 points and 9.4 rebounds per game. Junior point guard Tim Barnes averaged 11.3 points per game.

Following the 2002–03 season, pictures surfaced showing Larry Eustachy at a student party in Columbia, Missouri. Eustachy attended the party just hours after his team had lost to Missouri. Though Eustachy broke no laws, he did violate a conduct clause in his contract, which led to Eustachy's public admission of alcoholism. Eustachy subsequently resigned on May 5, 2003, receiving a $960,000 settlement from Iowa State.

 Wayne Morgan & Greg McDermott era (2003–2010) 
In 2004 Iowa State reached the NIT semifinals under Wayne Morgan with wins over Georgia, Florida State, and Marquette, before falling to Rutgers. In 2005 Iowa State reached the NCAA Tournament and defeated the University of Minnesota in a 1st-round game, losing to eventual national champion the University of North Carolina. Both teams were led by Curtis Stinson and NBA Draft pick Will Blalock.  Morgan's won-lost record from 2003 to 2006 was 55–39.

Morgan was replaced by Greg McDermott, who previously coached at Northern Iowa. During McDermott's tenure, he recruited Craig Brackins, Michael Taylor, Justin Hamilton, Diante Garrett and Wes Johnson, all of whom would eventually play in the NBA. In 2010, McDermott resigned to accept the head coaching position at Creighton. From 2006 to 2010 Greg McDermott recorded a won lost record of 59–68 with no NCAA appearances. He was replaced by Fred Hoiberg.

 Fred Hoiberg era (2010–2015) 
On April 27, 2010, it was announced that Fred Hoiberg, a star at Iowa State in the early and mid-1990s, would become the 19th coach in the history of the Iowa State men's basketball program. In his first season as coach, Hoiberg led a team with only four returning players to a 16–16 record.

In his second season, Iowa State had a much deeper team with players such as Royce White, Chris Babb, and others now eligible to play after sitting out the previous year due to transfer rules. The Cyclones improved to 23–11, had 12 wins in the conference, and earned a #8 seed in the South Regional in the 2012 NCAA tournament, earning Hoiberg Big 12 Co-Coach of the Year honors. The Cyclones defeated the #9 seed and defending national champion Connecticut Huskies before falling to overall #1 seed and eventual champion Kentucky.

In Hoiberg's third season, the Cyclones earned a #10 seed and defeated #7 Notre Dame to advance to the Round of 32. It was the first year the Cyclones had been to the NCAA Tournament in back-to-back years since 2000–2001, and the first time the Cyclones had won Tournament games in successive seasons since 1996–1997.

Hoiberg entered his fourth season at Iowa State by guiding the team to its best start to a season with a 14–0 undefeated non-conference record before suffering its first loss to Big 12 rival Oklahoma, 87–82, on January 11, 2014, in Norman. The winning streak included victories over #7 Michigan and #23 Iowa, plus wins over George Mason, Akron, and Boise State to capture the Diamond Head Classic in Honolulu, Hawaii. The Cyclones entered the Big 12 men's basketball tournament with a 23–7 mark. After a close call with Kansas State in the quarterfinals, Iowa State faced Kansas in the semifinals, the only team it had not beaten at least once all year to that point. ISU emerged victorious this time, beating the Jayhawks, 94–83. Iowa State went on to beat Baylor in the Big 12 championship game, 74–65, for its first conference tournament title since 2000.

The Cyclones earned a #3 seed in the East Regional of the 2014 NCAA tournament and defeated their first opponent, North Carolina Central, 93–75. Another close call came next in the third-round game against North Carolina, with ISU prevailing, 85–83. The Cyclones advanced to the Sweet Sixteen for the first time since 2000, and lost to #7 seed Connecticut, 81–76 (the differential representing the Huskies' narrowest margin of victory during the tournament), the eventual national champion. This marked the third time in their last four trips to the NCAA Tournament that the Cyclones lost to the eventual national champions (2005 North Carolina, 2012 Kentucky, and 2014 Connecticut.)

In 2014–15, Hoiberg's Cyclones finished the season with a 25–9 overall record and 12–6 in the Big 12, finishing second to Kansas in the conference regular season. ISU defeated Texas, 69–67, Oklahoma, 67–65, and Kansas, 70–66, in the championship to win its second straight Big 12 Conference tournament championship. Invited to the NCAA Tournament for the fourth consecutive year, the #3 seed Cyclones were upset by #14 seed UAB, 60–59, in the first round. The Cyclones finished the season ranked ninth in the final AP poll.  After several weeks of speculation, Fred Hoiberg was hired on June 2, 2015, by the NBA's Chicago Bulls to be their head coach.

 Steve Prohm era (2015–2021) 
On June 8, 2015, Iowa State announced that Steve Prohm, previously the head coach at Murray State for four seasons, would become the 20th head coach of the Cyclones. After the departure of Fred Hoiberg, Prohm retained Assistant Coach T.J. Otzelberger and Assistant Coach Director of Basketball Operations Micah Byars on his staff, while making the additions of Assistant Coach William Small (formerly under Prohm as an assistant at Murray State), Assistant Coach Daniyal Robinson (formerly on staff at Loyola (IL)), and Special Assistant to the Head Coach Neill Berry, who was previously on staff at High Point, and played for Prohm in college at Southeastern Louisiana.  Prohm's first season was a success with a few bumps along the way.  The Cyclones finished the regular season 10–8 in conference play and 21–10 overall, this included wins over No. 1 Oklahoma and No. 4 Kansas.  The Cyclones then received a No. 4 seed in the NCAA tournament.  After wins over Iona and Arkansas–Little Rock they advanced to the Sweet Sixteen where they lost to Virginia.  After the conclusion of the season Otzelberger accepted the head coaching job at South Dakota State, Neill Berry was promoted to assistant coach.

On February 4, 2017, Iowa State won at No. 3 Kansas, ending the longest active home win streak in NCAA men's college basketball at 54 games. Iowa State became the first team to beat Bill Self more than once at Allen Fieldhouse. The Cyclones then proceeded to win their third conference tournament title in four years with wins over Oklahoma State, TCU and West Virginia. The Cyclones were selected as a five seed in NCAA tournament where they proceeded to beat the University of Nevada in the tournament's second round. Iowa State then lost to 4-seed Purdue in the round of 32, 80–76.

After a down 2017–2018 season, in 2018-2019 the Cyclones went 23–12, and 9–9 in the Big 12 conference.  They faced Baylor in the first round of the Big 12 Tournament, winning 83–66. They next beat number 1 seed Kansas State, 63–59.  They played Kansas in the Big 12 Championship and won 78–66. They were a 6 seed in the NCAA tournament. They played Ohio State, who was an 11 seed. They lost 62–59, after Ohio State point guard Aaron Craft hit a three-pointer with 0.2 seconds remaining.  On March 26, Iowa State announced that Prohm's contract had been extended through 2025,  while sophomore forward Cameron Lard requested a transfer from the school, citing the need for a fresh start.

On March 15, 2021, Prohm mutually parted ways with Iowa State University as the head men's basketball coach.

T.J. Otzelberger era (2021–2023)
On March 18, 2021, former Iowa State assistant coach T. J. Otzelberger, who spent the last 2 seasons as head coach at UNLV, was named the 21st head coach of the program.  As of March 7, 2022, the Cyclones are 20–12 in Otzelberger's first season with victories over Texas Tech, Texas, Memphis, and Iowa, suffering their first loss to #1 ranked Baylor on January 1, 2022.

 Head coach history 

 Season records 

{|

 Championships 

 All-time records 

 Record vs. Big 12 opponents 

 Current Big 12 opponents 

 Former Big 12 opponents 

 Record versus Iowa schools 

Records vs Iowa schools as of the end of December 9, 2021.

 Postseason tournament history 
Iowa State has appeared in the NCAA Tournament 21 times, with a current record of 21–22. 

NIT results
Iowa State has appeared in the National Invitational Tournament three times. The Cyclones have a record of 4–3.

 Seeds 

 NCAA tournament 

 Pageantry and traditions 

 Team name 
The original "Cyclone" football team first played during 1895. This team earned the nickname "Cyclones" when they soundly defeated Northwestern, 36–0. The Chicago Tribune the next day headlined the story about the game "STRUCK BY A CYCLONE — It Comes From Iowa and Devastates Evanston Town." Since then the name Cyclones has been associated with Iowa State.

 Mascot 

Borrowing from one of its school colors, Iowa State uses a cardinal, Cy, as its mascot instead of an actual tornado or Cyclone. Prior to the football match-up against Colorado on November 12, 2005, a tornado touched down in several places in and around Ames, Iowa, forcing fans to either weather the storm outside in the parking lot or seek shelter in the adjacent Bergstrom Indoor Training Facility or nearby Hilton Coliseum. Such an atmosphere was created that Iowa State was able to beat the favored Buffaloes, 30–16. When asked about the event, Colorado coach Gary Barnett said, "I thought we had a pretty good mascot. But when we showed up at Iowa State and they had a real tornado, that's the real deal."

 Rivalries 

 Iowa 

While the Kansas Jayhawks are the Cyclone's main basketball rival, Iowa State's biggest non-conference rival is the Cyclone's in-state rival the Iowa Hawkeyes.  This rivalry game counts toward the Iowa Corn Cy-Hawk Series that encompasses all athletic competitions between Iowa and Iowa State. The series began in 1909–10, but it was suspended between 1935 and 1970.  As of the 2021–22 season, Iowa leads the all-time basketball series 47–28.

 Hy-Vee Classic 

In the Hy-Vee Classic, which ran from 2012 to 2018, Iowa State played in-state rivals from the Missouri Valley Conference at Wells Fargo Arena in Des Moines, on an alternating basis each December: Drake in even years and Northern Iowa in odd years.

As of the 2018–19 season, Iowa State has a 38–13 lead in the all-time series against Northern Iowa (going 2–1 in Hy-Vee Classic games). Also as of that season, Iowa State has a 110–65 all-time series lead over Drake (going 4–0 in Hy-Vee Classic games).

 Facilities 

Hilton Coliseum

James H. Hilton Coliseum is a 14,384-seat multi-purpose arena in Ames, Iowa. The arena, which is part of the Iowa State Center, opened in 1971. It is home to the Iowa State Cyclones basketball, wrestling, gymnastics, and volleyball teams. The building was specifically built to hold in sound with a solid concrete structure, steel doors, and a crowd that sits just a few feet from the court. During big games, players from opposing teams, as well as Iowa State, have even said that the floor has shaken due to the loudness of the crowd. A record basketball crowd of 15,000 saw the Cyclones post a 97–94 win over Iowa in 1971.

Hilton Magic is the atmosphere created by the fans at Hilton Coliseum during men's and women's basketball games. The now famous moniker for Iowa State's home basketball facility was coined by Des Moines Register'' writer Buck Turnbull on February 14, 1989, after the Cyclones (with Johnny Orr as coach) stunned third-ranked Missouri,  82–75. The morning newspaper included a headline that read "Hilton Magic Spells 'Upset' One More Time." In the article, Turnbull called for more Hilton Magic in an upcoming game with Oklahoma State. Cyclone fans responded and ISU defeated the Cowboys, 90–81, and a nickname was born.

According to many sources, Hilton Coliseum is considered one of the toughest venues to play in the nation.

Sukup Basketball Complex

Opened in September 2009, Iowa State's new basketball practice facility is located on two acres of land (in west Ames) that was donated by a local developer, Dickson Jensen. The $8 million,  facility, includes two separate 10,000-square-foot gymnasiums for both the men's and women's basketball programs, as well as separate lounges and locker rooms, a theater room, a medical treatment area, and coaches' offices and conference rooms.

Hixson-Lied Student Success Center

The $10 million Hixson-Lied Student Success Center was designed for improving academic achievement campus-wide, with the second floor devoted specifically to student athletes. The facility was built using private contributions. Since its completion in 2006, Iowa State student athletes have dramatically improved in the classroom and now have a higher average grade point average than the rest of the student body.

Roster

}

NBA draft
As of the conclusion of the 2020 NBA draft, 41 Cyclone players have been selected in the NBA draft in the history of the program. Of these, ten players were selected in the first round, and eleven were selected in the second round.

Individual accomplishments

All-Time Cyclone scoring leaders

All-Time Cyclone rebounding leaders

All-Time Cyclone assist leaders

Cyclone All-Americans

First Team All-Conference selections

Retired numbers 

Iowa State has retired seven numbers to date:

See also
Iowa State Cyclones women's basketball

References

External links